Dartmoor Forest is a civil parish in Devon, England. It was formed in 1987 by the splitting of the former parish of Lydford. It covers about  entirely within Dartmoor National Park, and is the largest parish in Devon. Despite its size its population in 2001 was only 1,619. Due to its large size it is surrounded by many other parishes: these are, clockwise from the north, Belstone, South Tawton, Throwleigh, Gidleigh, Chagford, North Bovey, Manaton, Widecombe in the Moor, Holne, West Buckfastleigh, Dean Prior, South Brent, Ugborough, Harford, Cornwood, Shaugh Prior, Sheepstor, Walkhampton, Whitchurch, Peter Tavy, Lydford, land common to the parishes of Bridestowe and Sourton, and Okehampton Hamlets.

The principal settlement in the parish is Princetown.  Other settlements include Bellever, Hexworthy, Postbridge and Two Bridges.

References

Dartmoor
Civil parishes in Devon